STS-76 was NASA's 76th Space Shuttle mission, and the 16th mission for Atlantis. STS-76 launched on 22 March 1996 at 08:13:04 UTC from Kennedy Space Center, launch pad 39B. STS-76 lasted over 9 days, traveled about  while orbiting Earth an estimated 145 times, and landing at 13:28:57 UTC on 31 March 1996 at Edwards Air Force Base, runway 22.

The flight was the third Shuttle mission to dock with the Russian Space Station Mir, as part of the Shuttle–Mir program, carrying astronaut Shannon Lucid to the orbital laboratory to replace NASA astronaut Norman Thagard. STS-76 also carried a SPACEHAB single module along with Lucid, and on flight day 6, Linda M. Godwin and Michael R. Clifford performed the first U.S. spacewalk around two docked spacecraft since the last Skylab mission in 1974.

Crew

Spacewalks 
  Godwin and Clifford  – EVA 1
 EVA 1 Start: 27 March 1996 – 06:34 UTC
 EVA 1 End: 27 March 1996 – 12:36 UTC
 Duration: 6 hours, 02 minutes

Mission highlights 

The mission was the third linkup between a U.S. Space Shuttle and Russian space station Mir, and brought veteran astronaut Shannon Lucid to Mir to become the first American woman to live on the station. Her approximately four-and-a-half-month stay also eclipsed the long-duration U.S. spaceflight record set by the first American to live on Mir, Norm Thagard. Lucid was succeeded by astronaut John Blaha during STS-79 in August 1996, giving her the distinction of membership in four different flight crews — two U.S. and two Russian—and her stay on Mir kicked off the continuous U.S. presence in space for the next two years.

Payload bay configuration included the Orbiter Docking System in the forward area and a SPACEHAB single module toward the aft. STS-76 marked the first flight of a SPACEHAB pressurized module to support Shuttle-Mir dockings. The single module primarily served as a stowage area for a large supply of equipment for transfer to space station, but also carried the European Space Agency's Biorack experiment rack for on-orbit research.

Atlantis hooked up with Mir on flight day three, following same R-bar approach employed on STS-74. Actual connection between Orbiter Docking System and the Kristall module's docking port occurred at 21:34 EST, on 24 March 1996. Hatches opened a little less than two hours later. Awaiting Atlantis arrival were Mir 21 Commander Yury Onufriyenko and Flight Engineer Yuri Usachov, who were launched to Mir on 21 February 1996. In July, they were joined by Mir 22 Commander Valery Korzun, Flight Engineer Aleksandr Kaleri and CNES astronaut Claudie André-Deshays. After a two-week stay, André-Deshays would return to Earth with Onufriyenko and Usachov while Korzun and Kaleri remained on board with Lucid.

Experiment samples and miscellaneous equipment brought over to orbiter. In Biorack, 11 separate scientific investigations were conducted. Study topics included the effect of microgravity and cosmic radiation on plants, tissues, cells, bacteria and insects, and the effects of microgravity on bone loss. Also transferred to the station were the Mir Glovebox Stowage (MGBX) equipment to replenish the glovebox already on station, the Queen's University Experiment in Liquid Diffusion (QUELD) flown in the orbiter's middeck locker, and the High Temperature Liquid Phase Sintering (LPS) experiment.

On flight day six, Godwin and Clifford conducted what some claim to be the first U.S. extravehicular activity (EVA) around two mated spacecraft. However, this appears to ignore the Apollo 9 EVA, and EVAs during Skylab. During six-hour, two-minute, 28-second EVA, they attached four Mir Environmental Effects Payload (MEEP) experiments to the station's docking module - designed to characterize the environment around Mir over an 18-month period. Godwin and Clifford wore Simplified Aid For EVA Rescue (SAFER) propulsive devices -  first flight-tested during STS-64.

Other payloads included Shuttle Amateur Radio Experiment (SAREX), KidSat, a project that gives middle school students opportunity to participate in space exploration, and Trapped Ions in Space (TRIS), a Naval Research Laboratory experiment flown in a Getaway Special canister in the payload bay.

Gallery

See also 

 List of human spaceflights
 List of human spaceflights to Mir
 List of Space Shuttle missions
 Outline of space science

References

External links 
 NASA mission summary 
 STS-76 Video Highlights 
 STS-76 - Letters from the Lead FDO

Spacecraft launched in 1996
Edwards Air Force Base
STS-076